An open file format is a file format for storing digital data, defined by a published specification usually maintained by a standards organization, and which can be used and implemented by anyone. For example, an open format can be implemented by both proprietary and free and open source software, using the typical software licenses used by each. In contrast to open formats, closed formats are considered trade secrets. Open formats are also called free file formats if they are not encumbered by any copyrights, patents, trademarks or other restrictions (for example, if they are in the public domain) so that anyone may use them at no monetary cost for any desired purpose.

Open formats (in alphabetical order) include:

Multimedia

Imaging
APNG – It allows for animated PNG files that work similarly to animated GIF files.
AVIF – An image format using AV1 compression.
FLIF – Free Lossless Image Format.
GBR – a 2D binary vector image file format, the de facto standard in the printed circuit board (PCB) industry
GIF – CompuServe's Graphics Interchange Format (openly published specification, but patent-encumbered by a third party; became free when patents expired in 2004)
JPEG – a lossy image format widely used to display photographic images, standardized by ISO/IEC
JPEG 2000 – an image format standardized by ISO/IEC
JPEG XL – an image format designed to outperform and replace existing formats. Especially legacy JPEG. Supports both lossy and lossless compression. 
MNG – moving pictures, based on PNG
OpenEXR – a high dynamic range imaging image file format, released as an open standard along with a set of software tools created by Industrial Light and Magic (ILM).
OpenRaster – a format for raster graphics editors that saves layers
PNG – a raster image format standardized by ISO/IEC
QOI – a simple, fast and lossless open source image file format https://qoiformat.org/
SVG – a vector image format standardized by W3C
WebP – image format developed by Google
XPM – image file format used by the X Window System

Audio
ALAC – lossless audio codec, previously a proprietary format of Apple Inc.
FLAC – lossless audio codec
DAISY Digital Talking Book – a talking book format
Musepack – an audio codec
MP3 – lossy audio codec, previously patented
Ogg – container for Vorbis, FLAC, Speex and Opus (audio formats) & Theora (a video format), each of which is an open format
Opus – a lossy audio compression format developed by the IETF. Suitable for VoIP, videoconferencing (just audio), music transmission over the Internet and streaming applications (just audio).
Speex – speech codec
Vorbis – a lossy audio compression format.
WavPack – "Hybrid" (lossless/lossy) audio codec

Video
AV1
Dirac – a video compression format supporting both lossless and lossy compression
 Matroska (mkv) – container for all type of multimedia formats (audio, video, images, subtitles)
WebM – a video/audio container format
Theora – a lossy video compression format.

Various
DAE - A 3D model/scene format standardized by Khronos.
glTF - A 3D model/scene format standardized by Khronos.
CMML – timed metadata and subtitles
SMIL – a media playlisting format and multimedia integration language
VRML/X3D – realtime 3D data formats standardized by ISO/IEC
XSPF – a playlist format for multimedia

Text

 Plain text – encoded in numerous non-proprietary encodings, such as ASCII
 CSV – comma-separated values, commonly used for spreadsheets or simple databases
 HTML – HyperText Markup Language (HTML) is the main markup language for creating web pages and other information that can be displayed in a web browser.
 Unicode Transformation Formats – text encodings with support for all common languages and scripts
 UTF-8 – byte oriented and ASCII compatible
 UTF-16 – 16-bit oriented
 Markdown – Lightweight markup language that converts to HTML
DVI – device independent (TeX)
DocBook – XML-based standard to publish books
Darwin Information Typing Architecture – adaptable XML-based format for technical documentation, maintained by the OASIS consortium
ePub – e-book standard by the International Digital Publishing Forum (IDPF)
FictionBook – XML-based e-book format, which originated and gained popularity in Russia
LaTeX – document markup language
Office Open XML – a formatted text format (ISO/IEC 29500:2008); see Licensing for details
OpenDocument – a formatted text format (ISO/IEC 26300:2006); see Licensing for details
OpenXPS – open standard for a page description language and a fixed-document format
 PDF started as a proprietary standard. PDF version 1.7 was standardized as ISO 32000-1 in 2008. However, some technologies indispensable for the full implementation of ISO 32000-1 are defined only by Adobe and remain proprietary (e.g. Adobe XML Forms Architecture, Adobe JavaScript). ISO 32000-2:2017 (PDF 2.0) does not include these dependencies. Various subsets of PDF have been standardized to meet a variety of needs, including ISO 15930 (PDF/X), ISO 19005 (PDF/A), ISO 14829 (PDF/UA) and ISO 24517 (PDF/E). The PDF Association has also standardized PDF/raster).
PostScript – a page description language and programming language, started as a proprietary standard but is now a public specification.
XHTML – XHTML (Extensible HyperText Markup Language) is a family of XML markup languages that mirror or extend versions of the widely used Hypertext Markup Language (HTML), the language in which web pages are written.
ZIM – a file format that stores wiki content for offline usage.

Archiving and compression 
7z – for archiving and/or compression
B1 – for archiving and/or compression
bzip2 – for compression
gzip – for compression
lzip – for compression
MAFF – for web page archiving, based on ZIP
PAQ – for compression
SQX – for archiving and/or compression
tar – for archiving
xz – for compression
ZIP – for archiving and/or compression; the base format is in the public domain, but newer versions have some patented features

Other 

 CSS – style sheet format usually used with (X)HTML, standardized by W3C
 DjVu – file format for scanned images or documents
 EAS3 – binary file format for floating point data
 ELF – Executable and Linkable Format
 FreeOTFE – container for encrypted data
 GPX – GPs eXchange format – for describing waypoints, tracks and routes
 HDF – multi-platform data format for storing multidimensional arrays, among other data structures
 HTML/XHTML – markup language for web pages (ISO/IEC 15445:2000)
 iCalendar – calendar data format
 IFC – data model describing building and construction industry data
 JSON – object notation, subset of YAML and correct ECMAScript statement
 LTFS – Linear Tape File System
 NetCDF – data format for multidimensional arrays
 NZB – for multipart binary files on Usenet
 RDF - graph based data model standardized by W3C, includes 7 standard serializations, N-Triples, N-Quads, Turtle, TriG, RDF/XML, JSON-LD and RDFa
 RSS – syndication
 SDXF – the Structured Data eXchange Format
 SFV – checksum format
 LUKS – disk-encryption specification originally intended for Linux
 TrueCrypt – discontinued container for encrypted data
 WOFF – font file format used in webpages
 XML – a general-purpose markup language, standardized by W3C
 YAML – human readable data serialization format

References

External links

OpenFormats

Computer file formats
 
Computing-related lists